Kreiken may refer to:

Egbert Adriaan Kreiken, Dutch astronomer
Kreiken Observatory Ankara University
Kreiken (crater)